Angus Gibson (1842–1920) was a sugar planter and politician. He was a Member of the Queensland Legislative Council.

Political life
Angus Gibson was a member of Gooburrum Divisional Board and its chairman in 1888. From 1895 to 1900, he was a member of the Kolan Divisional Board from 1895 to 1900.

On 6 April 1899, he was appointed to the Queensland Legislative Council, ending with his death on 28 May 1920. Gibson was buried in South Kolan Cemetery.

References

Members of the Queensland Legislative Council
1842 births
1920 deaths